Margaret Binley (sometimes Bingley) was an English silversmith.

A specialist in the creation of wine labels, Binley is usually classified as a smallworker, although she is also listed as a bucklemaker, buttonmaker, and goldsmith. Resident in London, she registered her date mark on 15 May 1764, and continued active until the middle of the following decade. She was married to smallworker Richard Binley, from whom she was later widowed, and lived in Gutter Lane. No record of apprenticeship or freedom has been found.

Examples of Binley's work continue to turn up for sale.  A Hermitage wine label, dated to around 1775, is owned by the National Museum of Women in the Arts.

References

Year of birth missing
Year of death missing
18th-century English women artists
Artists from London
English silversmiths
Women silversmiths